Inspector Hornleigh Intervenes (German: Inspektor Hornleigh greift ein...) is a 1961 West German crime television series broadcast on WDR in four episodes. It is based on the fictional Scotland Yard detective Inspector Hornleigh, who had previously appeared in British radio and film series. The episodes were scripted by Hans Wolfgang Priwin, who had previously co-written the BBC radio series but was a German by birth. The sets were designed by the art director Alfred Bütow.

Helmut Peine played Hornleigh, while Wolfgang Forester played his sidekick Sergeant Bingham. Paul Klinger hosted each episode. Other actors appearing in the series included Horst Breitkreuz, Siegfried Wischnewski, Alf Marholm and Joachim Teege.

The four episodes were Der Mann aus Tanganjika, Der Schuß fiel gegenüber, Zwei Stühle mit Vergangenheit and Mord ohne Motiv.

References

Bibliography
 Ingrid Brück, Andrea Guder, Reinhold Viehoff & Karin When. Der deutsche Fernsehkrimi: Eine Programm- und Produktionsgeschichte von den Anfängen bis heute. Springer-Verlag, 2017.
 Martin Compart. Crime TV: Lexikon der Krimi-Serien. Bertz + Fischer, 2000.

External links
 

Television shows set in London
1961 German television series debuts
1961 German television series endings
1960s crime television series
German-language television shows
German crime television series
1960s German police procedural television series